Flight hours is an aviation term referring to the total amount of time spent piloting aircraft, and serves as the primary measure of a pilot's experience.  Flight hours (or flight time) is defined as "when an aircraft moves under its own power for the purpose of flight and ends when the aircraft comes to rest after landing."  Time spent taxiing and performing pre-flight checks on the ground is included in flight hours, provided the engine is running.

Recording flight time 
Most government licensing regulations have specific flight hour requirements, as do virtually all airline job listings.  Consequently, all pilots maintain a logbook (at least while pursuing a license or to record proof of recurrent training).  A pilot's logbook is considered a legal document.  Most pilots maintain a traditional hard copy, but electronic versions such as the one included with the popular app ForeFlight are allowed.  Flight hours are recorded in 0.1 hour increments, which correspond to the resolution of a typical Hobbs meter, an odometer-like instrument installed in most cockpits.  Pilots record many details about their flight time, such as whether a flight occurred during the day or at night, in a single- or multi-engine aircraft, in visual or instrument conditions, and the pilot's role during the flight.

Required hours by certificate/rating 

Pilots are required to accumulate a certain number and type of flight hours for each certificate or rating.  The requirements become more numerous with each successive rating, but most requirements can be "stacked" (i.e. flying cross-country in instrument conditions fulfills both cross-country and instrument hour requirements).  Detailed requirements for each rating can be found in 14 CFR Part 61 and in the sections to follow.

Overview 

While it is theoretically possible to achieve a certificate/rating at the minimum hour requirements, pilots are required to demonstrate proficiency before they can take the written, oral, and practical tests for each.  The Private Pilot Certificate in particular is known to take students more than the legal minimum hours to complete.  These minimums were set decades ago, before the era of complex GPS units and an increasingly regulated National Airspace System.  The national average for the Private Pilot Certificate is currently estimated at 60-75 hours.

Private Pilot Certificate 
According to FAR Part 61.109(a), to be eligible for a Private Pilot Certificate the following aeronautical experience requirements must be met:

 40 hours of total flight time
 20 hours of flight training with an instructor
 3 hours of cross-country training with an instructor in a single-engine airplane
 3 hours of night flight training with an instructor in a single-engine airplane
 A 100nm night cross-country flight with an instructor
 3 hours of simulated instrument flying with an instructor
 10 night takeoffs & landings
 3 solo takeoffs & landings at a towered airport
 10 hours of solo flight
 5 hours of solo cross-country flight
 A 150nm solo cross-country flight

Instrument Rating 
According to FAR Part 61.65(d), to be eligible for an Instrument Rating the following aeronautical experience requirements must be met:

 50 hours of Pilot In Command cross-country flight
 10 hours of Pilot In Command cross-country flight in an airplane
 40 hours of actual or simulated instrument flying
 15 hours of actual or simulated instrument flying in an airplane
 A 250nm instrument cross-country flight, landing via 3 different types of instrument approach procedure

Commercial Pilot Certificate 
According to FAR Part 61.129(a), to be eligible for a Commercial Pilot Certificate the following aeronautical experience requirements must be met:

 250 hours of total flight time
 100 hours of flight time in powered aircraft
 50 hours of flight time in an airplane
 100 hours as Pilot In Command
 50 hours as Pilot In Command in an airplane
 50 hours of Pilot In Command cross-country flight
 10 hours of Pilot In Command cross-country flight in an airplane
 20 hours of flight training with an instructor
 10 hours of simulated instrument flying with an instructor
 5 hours of simulated instrument training with an instructor in a single-engine airplane
 10 hours of complex aircraft training with an instructor
 A 2-hour, 100nm day cross-country flight with an instructor in a single-engine airplane
 A 2-hour, 100nm night cross-country flight with an instructor in a single-engine airplane
 10 hours of solo flight in a single-engine airplane
 a 300nm cross-country flight in a single-engine airplane with 3 landings, and one landing 250nm from the departure airport
 5 hours of night flight in VFR conditions as Pilot In Command 
 10 night takeoffs & landings as Pilot In Command

Private Pilot Certificate, Multi-Engine Rating 

According to FAR Part 61.109(a), to be eligible for a Multi-Engine Rating the following aeronautical experience requirements must be met:

Commercial Pilot Certificate, Multi-engine Rating 

According to  FAR Part 61.129(a), to be eligible for a Commercial Pilot Certificate, Multi-Engine Rating the following aeronautical experience requirements must be met:

Air Transport Pilot Certificate 
According to FAR Part 61.159(a), to be eligible for an Air Transport Pilot Certificate the following aeronautical experience requirements must be met:

References

Terminology
Aircraft operations